Elgin is a historic house in Natchez, Adams County, Mississippi.

Location
It is located South of Natchez, Mississippi, off U.S. Route 61.

History
It was built in 1791 and was later the "town house" of Dr John Carmichael Jenkins (1809-1855), a prominent planter. It has twenty-five acres of garden.

It has been listed on the National Register of Historic Places since January 19, 1979. It now serves as a bed & breakfast.

References

Houses on the National Register of Historic Places in Mississippi
Houses in Natchez, Mississippi
Bed and breakfasts in Mississippi
National Register of Historic Places in Natchez, Mississippi